Ngô Thành Liêm (1926 – 1980) was a Vietnamese cyclist. He competed in the individual and team road race events at the 1956 Summer Olympics.

References

External links
 

1926 births
1980 deaths
People from Cần Thơ
Vietnamese male cyclists
Olympic cyclists of Vietnam
Cyclists at the 1956 Summer Olympics
Asian Games medalists in cycling
Cyclists at the 1958 Asian Games
Medalists at the 1958 Asian Games
Asian Games bronze medalists for Vietnam
20th-century Vietnamese people